Albert Sanschagrin, O.M.I. (August 5, 1911 – April 2, 2009) was Bishop Emeritus of Saint-Hyacinthe, Quebec, Canada, and the oldest Canadian bishop of the Roman Catholic Church at the time of his death.

Biography
He was ordained a priest in the order of the Oblates of Mary Immaculate on May 5, 1936. He was appointed Auxiliary Bishop of Amos, Quebec, Canada on August 12, 1957. He was ordained Bishop of Bagis on September 14, 1957. He was appointed Bishop of Saint-Hyacinthe, Quebec on June 13, 1967. He retired on July 18, 1979.

References

1911 births
2009 deaths
20th-century Roman Catholic bishops in Canada
Participants in the Second Vatican Council
Roman Catholic bishops of Saint-Hyacinthe
People from Mauricie
Roman Catholic bishops of Amos
Missionary Oblates of Mary Immaculate